Jeff Pevar is an American musician who has recorded and toured with numerous renowned artists as well as having a solo career. Pevar recorded a debut record on his label Pet Peev Music™, called From The Core, which was released in December 2012. In 2015 Pevar released a CD, Grateful Jazz which he produced for the ensemble Jazz Is Dead which he performed a number of tours with.

Pevar has worked with musicians such as  Crosby, Stills and Nash, Donald Fagen's Rock & Soul, James Taylor, Marc Cohn, Ray Charles, Joe Cocker, Jimmy Webb, Rickie Lee Jones, Dr. John, Carly Simon, Kenny Loggins, Wilson Pickett, Jazz Is Dead, Phil Lesh and Friends, David Foster, Meat Loaf, Phil Collins, Aztec Two-Step, Richie Havens, Odetta, Jonatha Brooke, Willy Deville, Joe Linus, Peter Gallway and Pat McGee.  He is a founding member of CPR aka Crosby, Pevar & Raymond.

References

External links
Official Web Site
Jeff Pevar collection at the Internet Archive's live music archive

Living people
American session musicians
Year of birth missing (living people)
Jazz Is Dead members